SQS can mean:
 Amazon Simple Queue Service, a hosted message queue service for web applications.
 Spatial Query Server, Boeing Spatial Query Server (SQS) - Spatial Database
 The ICAO-Code from Susi Air, an Indonesian Airline